Peter Hollindale (born 1936) is an educationalist and literary critic.

Hollindale taught at Derwent College, York from 1936 to 1999.

Three Levels of Ideology
Hollindale's most renowned theory was that of the three levels of ideology in a text, which pertained to all four modern reading approaches (author-centred, reader-centred, text-centred, world-view-centred).

The levels are as follows:
1) The author's profound message in a text
2) The unexamined assumptions of the author
3) The ideologies of the author's world

References

Hollindale, Peter (1998) Ideology and The Children's Book, Thimble Press: Woodchester, UK 

British literary critics
Living people
1936 births